The 2019–20 season of Atlético Petróleos de Luanda is the club's 39th season in the Girabola, the Angolan Premier football League and 39th consecutive season in the top flight of Angolan football. In 2019–20,  the club is participating in the Girabola, the Angola Cup and the CAF Champions League.

On April 30, 2020, in a meeting with representatives of the 2019–20 season girabola clubs, the Angolan Football Federation decided to cancel the 2019-20 Girabola season due to the coronavirus pandemic.

Squad information

Staff

Pre-season transfers

Mid-season transfers

Overview

Angolan League

League table

Match details

Results

Results by round

Results summary

CAF Champions League

Group stage

First round

Preliminary round

Results summary

Angola Cup

Round of 16

Season statistics

Appearances

Scorers

Own goals

Clean sheets

Season progress

See also
 List of Atlético Petróleos de Luanda players

External links
 PetroLuanda.co.ao Official club website 
 Match schedule
 Girabola.com profile
 Zerozero.pt profile
 Facebook profile

References

Atlético Petróleos de Luanda seasons
Petro de Luanda